North Point High School is a school for career and technology education (formerly science, technology, and industry). It is located in the far western area of Waldorf, Maryland, United States.  At  and with about 2,200 students enrolled, it is the largest high school in Charles County. It is also the second newest high school, having opened in 2005.  Its mascot, the Eagle, was derived from the motto of Charles County, "The wild side of the Potomac... Where eagles soar!"

Technology
North Point has 17 career and technology education programs (formerly as STI for science, technology and industry). An estimated half of the student body is enrolled in one of these programs, while the other half receives a normal high school education.

The programs are as follows:

School of Advanced Technology and Engineering
Biotechnology
Cisco Networking Academy
Cisco is sponsoring a demonstration at North Point High School of its learning environment.
North Point High School offers the first of four classes in completion of the CCNP exam.
Electronics
Engineering
Manufacturing

School of Technology
Automotive Technology
Collision Repair
Graphic Communications
Welding Technology

School of Construction Development
Carpentry
Drafting
Electrical Construction

School of Health and Protective Services
Cosmetology
Criminal Justice
Culinary Arts
Education Careers
Academy of Health Professions

Honors and awards
North Point's SkillsUSA chapter won medals at the SkillsUSA National Leadership Conference in June 2010.  The group placed first (gold) in Industrial Motor control, and second (silver) in Culinary Arts. In its first year ever competing in quiz bowl, that team also brought home a gold medal.

Athletics
North Point High School has 44 total sports ranging from the Freshman to the Varsity Levels, which compete in the Southern Maryland Athletic Conference (SMAC). North Point competes in the class 3A division.
Until 2011, The athletic director for North Point was Aly Khan "A.K." Johnson, brother of Penn State Defensive Line Football coach Larry Johnson, and uncle of Larry Johnson Jr.

State Championships
The 2008 North Point CoEd Varsity Golf won the Maryland 2A State Title on 23 October.
The North Point Boys Varsity Track teams have collected two state championships. In 2008, they won the Maryland 2A Outdoor Track and Field State Championship (in a tie with Walkersville High School on 24 May. The following winter, they won the 2008/2009 Maryland 2A Indoor Track and Field State Championship on 16 February.
In 2009, the Girls Varsity Outdoor Track and Field team won the Maryland 2A Outdoor Track and Field State Championship on 23 May.
The 2010-2011 North Point's Boys Varsity Basketball Team Completed an undefeated 27–0 season with a win against Patterson Senior High in the Maryland 4A Boys Basketball State Championship game on 12 March. North Point is the first team from the SMAC to win a state championship in Boys Basketball since 1999

As of Fall, 2022, North Point's Boys Soccer Program's coaching staff is: 
 Coaches Camden Ballard Kevin Laskow and Christian Eubanks,

Notable alumni
 Brothers Timmy Hill and Tyler Hill, NASCAR drivers
Asante Blackk, actor
Sujita Basnet, Miss Universe Nepal 2021
Rasheed Walker, NFL offensive tackle for the Green Bay Packers

References

External links

Public high schools in Maryland
Schools in Charles County, Maryland
Waldorf, Maryland
Educational institutions established in 2005
2005 establishments in Maryland